The Verna Fields Award is the Golden Reel Award which is annually presented by Motion Picture Sound Editors to a filmmaking student in order to recognize the excellence of their sound editing work. Luke Dunn Gielmuda of the Australian Film Television and Radio School won the 1998 award for his work on Preoccupied. At the 2004 Golden Reel Awards held at Century Plaza Hotel, Manny Holihan won the Verna Fields Award.

2006
Winner: Crooked Mick

Nominees:
 Afterlife
 Below the Silence
 Danya
 The Resurrectionist

2007
Winner: Temerario

Nominees:
 Bio Rhythm
 Dalton Jones
 Flapwing and the Last Work of Ezekiel Crumb
 Synchronoff

2008
Winner: Shot Open

Nominees:
 For the Love of God
 The Hollow Tree
 Procrastination
 Sea of Tranquility

2009
Winner: Mummy's Boy

Nominees:
 Cupid
 Elephants
 Four
 Joyets
 Street Angel

2010
Winner: Scarecrow

Nominees:
 The End of the Line
 The GodMother
 The Incredible Story of My Great Grandmother Olive
 Yellow Belly End

2011
Winner: Stanley Pickle

Nominees:
 The Confession
 En Route
 Psychosis
 Zbigniev's Cupboard

2012
Winner: The Pride of Wade Ellison

Nominees: 
 Damned
 Inferno
 The Maiden and the Princess
 The Pride of Wade Ellison
 The Secret Numbers

2013
Winner: Head Over Heels

Nominees: 
 Dawn
 Elie's Overcoat
 Exedia Nation
 Fragments
 Head Over Heels
 In Aeternam
 My Face is in Space
 Stumble

2014
Winner: Robomax

Nominees: 
 Anamnesis
 First Light
 If You're Serious
 The Magnificent Lion Boy
 Miss Todd
 Robomax
 Sleeping With The Fishes

2015
Winner: Sea Odyssey

Nominees:
 Sin Frontera
 The Night Guardian
 Hominid
 Sea Odyssey
 Posthumous

2021
Winner: Build Me Up (Supervising Sound Editor: Wong Hui Grace)

Nominees:
 Cocon (Supervising Sound Editor: Freija Hogenboom, Sound Effects Editor: Camiel Povel, Foley Artist: Annika Epker)
 Build Me Up (Supervising Sound Editor: Wong Hui Grace)
 Do Not Feed the Pigeons (Supervising Sound Editor: Joe De-Vine)
 The Many Faces of Ava (Supervising Sound Editor: Dominika Latusek)
 Other Half (Supervising Sound Editor: Zoltán Kadnár)
 Night of the Living Dread (Supervising Sound Editor: Miles Sullivan)
 Pressure (Supervising Sound Editor: Antek Rutczynski)
 Échale Ganas, The Villa’s Tacos Story (Supervising Sound Editor: Mingxin Qiguan)

2022
Winner: Brutal (Supervising Sound Editor: Dan Hibbert)

Nominees:
 Ascent (Supervising Sound Editor: Guldem Masa)
 Brutal (Supervising Sound Editor: Dan Hibbert)
 Enemy Alien (Supervising Sound Editor: Jonathan Mendolicchio)
 Entertain Me (Supervising Sound Editor: Sam Titshof, Foley Artists: Nancy Konijn, Levi Cuijpers)
 Key of See (Supervising Sound Editor: Manuel Simon, Foley Artists: Conor Van Slyke, George Allan)
 Spring Roll Dream (Supervising Sound Editor: Carlos Eligio San Juan Juanchi)
 This Is Your Captain Speaking (Supervising Sound Editor: Zoé Beekes, Dialogue Editor: Felicia Koolhoven, Sound Effects Editors: Teun Beumer, Jurriaan Kruithof)
 Whiteboy (Supervising Sound Editor: Oliver Mapp)

References

Golden Reel Awards (Motion Picture Sound Editors)
Film editing awards